Johannes Stephan Hendrik Malan (born ) is a South African rugby union player for Lazio in the Top12 in Italy. He can play as a loose-forward or a lock.

Playing career

Griquas

Malan graduated from the Vikings Christian Rugby Academy in Marburg, KwaZulu-Natal and joined Kimberley-based provincial side  during the 2015 season. He was named in the  squad for the 2014 Under-21 Provincial Championship and started all seven of their matches in Group B of the competition. He scored a try in their 21–28 defeat to eventual champions  in Round Seven of the competition, helping Griquas to fifth spot on the log, missing out on the play-off places.

Malan was named in the senior Griquas squad for the 2015 Vodacom Cup. He came on as a replacement in each of their remaining matches in the regular season of the competition, helping Griquas to finish in second spot on the Southern Section log to qualify for the quarter finals.

Leopards

Cheetahs

Malan joined the Bloemfontein-based  for the 2018 season. He played six matches for the  during the 2018 Rugby Challenge, five matches for the Free State Cheetahs in the 2018 Currie Cup Premier Division and a further three matches for the  franchise in the 2018–19 Pro14 tournament.

Lazio

In 2019, Malan joined Italian Top12 side Lazio.

References

South African rugby union players
Living people
1994 births
Rugby union locks
Rugby union flankers
Griquas (rugby union) players
Leopards (rugby union) players
Free State Cheetahs players
Cheetahs (rugby union) players
S.S. Lazio Rugby 1927 players